George Barker (1776–1845) was a solicitor in, and a benefactor to, Birmingham, once a town in Warwickshire (and now a city in the West Midlands county), in England. He was also a street commissioner there, and a governor of King Edward's School.

As a conservative, he campaigned unsuccessfully against the incorporation of Birmingham, which was nonetheless enacted in October 1838.

He devoted a large portion of his time both to scientific pursuits and to benevolent and social enterprises. He exerted himself with great energy to extend the advantages of the General Hospital, on behalf of which he was one of the chief promoters of, and a long-standing chairman of the committee of, the Birmingham Triennial Music Festival, until ill health forced his retirement in 1843. He was the founder of the now defunct Birmingham Philosophical Institution, and by his lectures on chemistry gave a considerable impetus to certain special manufactures. From the first he took a special interest in the inventions of James Watt and Matthew Boulton, becoming friends with both men. It was chiefly owing to his exertions that an Act of Parliament was obtained for the London and Birmingham Railway. In recognition of his scientific achievements he was elected a Fellow of the Royal Society in 1839. He died on 6 December 1845 at his home in the city's Springfield district.

Botany 

Barker was an enthusiastic and competent botanist. Species named by him include:

 Epidendrum blepharistes
 Oncidium incurvum

Bust 

In 1844, following Barker's retirement from the Music Festival committee, £560 was raised by public subscription. This was used to buy him a gift of silverware, and to pay for a bust in marble, by Peter Hollins. The latter was exhibited at the Birmingham Society of Artists in 1844, where a reviewer from The Art Journal saw it and was compelled to write:

The bust was subsequently placed in the General Hospital, and was later reported as being with a now-defunct firm of Birmingham solicitors, Lee, Crowder and Co, with which Barker was connected. It is now privately held.

References

1776 births
1845 deaths
People from Birmingham, West Midlands
British philanthropists
London and Birmingham Railway
Fellows of the Royal Society
English solicitors